Kakadu is the German word for cockatoo 

Kakadu may refer to:

Places

Australia
 Kakadu National Park, a protected area
 Kakadu Highway, a highway in the Northern Territory
 Kakadu, Northern Territory, a locality

Plants and animals

Australia
 Kakadu dunnart, a species of dunnart 
 Kakadu pebble-mound mouse, a species of  rodent
 Kakadu plum, a species of flowering plant
 Kakadu woolly-butt, a species of  tree
 Kakadu sand goanna, a species of monitor lizard 
 Kakadu vicetail, a species of dragonfly

Arts and entertainment
 Kakadu Variations, by Ludwig van Beethoven
 Kakadu und Kiebitz, a 1920 German silent film
 Kakadu (Sculthorpe), an orchestral composition by Peter Sculthorpe

Other
 Kakadu language, an extinct Australian Aboriginal language
 Kakadu (people), an Australian Aboriginal people
 Kakadu (sailplane), a large sailplane built in 1928 by Julius Hatry
 Kakadu (software), a software library for encoding and decoding JPEG 2000 images
 Kakadu Storm, a rugby team in the Darwin Rugby League

Language and nationality disambiguation pages